The Lindsey State Jail (formally the John R Lindsey State Jail) is a privately operated minimum- and medium-security prison for men located in Jacksboro, Jack County, Texas. The facility is operated by Corrections Corporation of America under contract with the Texas Department of Criminal Justice and houses state inmates.

CCA has run the facility since 2004, and it has an official capacity of 1031 inmates.

References

Prisons in Texas
Buildings and structures in Jack County, Texas
CoreCivic
1995 establishments in Texas